Adult Contemporary is a chart published by Billboard ranking the top-performing songs in the United States in the adult contemporary music (AC) market.  In 2017, 11 different songs topped the chart in 52 issues of the magazine, based on weekly airplay data from radio stations compiled by Nielsen Broadcast Data Systems.

In the first issue of Billboard of 2017 singers Brett Eldredge and Meghan Trainor moved up to number one with their version of "Baby, It's Cold Outside", displacing another festive song, "This Christmas" by the band Train.  The following week, as the chart began to reflect post-Christmas airplay, Eldredge and Trainor's song dropped all the way to number 30, the chart's lowest position, and was replaced in the top spot by Adele's song "Send My Love (To Your New Lover)".  In the issue dated February 25, Justin Timberlake's song "Can't Stop the Feeling!" regained the top spot more than nine months after it first entered the chart, in its 41st week on the listing.  The song, taken from the soundtrack of the film Trolls, had been one of the biggest hits of 2016, topping both the AC chart and Billboards all-genre chart, the Hot 100.  In January 2017 it was nominated for the Academy Award for Best Original Song, and shortly after it regained the number one position on the Adult Contemporary listing Timberlake performed the song at the 89th Academy Awards ceremony.

In early May, British singer Ed Sheeran's song "Shape of You" reached number one, a position which it went on to hold for more than five months without interruption.  The track's total of 24 weeks atop the chart was the second-longest run by a song at number one on the AC listing to date, behind only Uncle Kracker's 2003 recording of "Drift Away", which spent 28 weeks in the top spot.  "Shape of You" was the biggest-selling song of the year in the United States, and topped the Hot 100, as well as a number of genre-specific charts ranging from Adult Contemporary to Dance Club Songs.  It was finally displaced from the top of the Adult Contemporary chart in the issue of Billboard dated October 21 by "Something Just Like This", a collaboration between American DJ/production duo the Chainsmokers and British band Coldplay, another example of a song that achieved success in both the Adult Contemporary and dance music markets.  Having started with a festive song at number one, the year ended with another in the top spot, as Australian singer Sia topped the chart for the final two weeks of the year with her song "Santa's Coming for Us".

Chart history

See also
2017 in American music

References

2017
Number-one adult contemporary singles
United States Adult Contemporary